The Waverly Bridge near Waverly, Mississippi is a railway swinging bridge spanning between Lowndes County, Mississippi and Clay County, Mississippi.  It brings the Columbus and Greenville Railway across the Tombigbee River.

It was built in 1914 by the Wisconsin Bridge and Iron Co. for the Columbus and Greenville Railway.  It was listed on the National Register of Historic Places in 1989.

It is a swinging through truss bridge.

References

Swing bridges in the United States
Railroad bridges on the National Register of Historic Places in Mississippi
National Register of Historic Places in Clay County, Mississippi
National Register of Historic Places in Lowndes County, Mississippi
Buildings and structures completed in 1914